The 2010 United States Senate election in Oregon was held on November 2, 2010 alongside other elections to the United States Senate in other states, as well as elections to the United States House of Representatives and various state and local elections. Incumbent Democratic U.S. Senator Ron Wyden won re-election to a third full term by a landslide margin of 18 points, despite the national Republican midterm wave. As of 2022, this is the only senate election since 1998 in which Deschutes County has not supported Wyden (albeit by a plurality).

Democratic primary

Candidates 

 Pavel Goberman, fitness instructor and mentalist, perennial candidate
 Loren Hooker, farmer
 Ron Wyden, incumbent U.S. Senator

Polling

Results

Republican primary

Candidates 

 Shane Dinkel, U.S. Army officer and farm worker
 Jim Huffman, Lewis & Clark Law School law professor
 Loren Later, businessman
 Robin Parker, businessman
 Thomas Stutzman, real estate broker
 Keith Waldron, farmer and truck driver
 Walter Woodland, woodworker

Polling

Results

General election

Candidates 
 Bruce Cronk (Working Families), retired electrician
 Marc Delphine (Libertarian), financial planner and LGBT and Tea Party activist
 Jim Huffman (Republican), Lewis & Clark Law School law professor
 Rick Staggenborg (Progressive), physician and founder of Soldiers For Peace
 Ron Wyden (Democratic), incumbent U.S. Senator

Campaign 
Wyden, a popular incumbent with a 52% approval rating in a July poll, touted bipartisanship and promised to hold town-hall meetings annually in each of Oregon's 36 counties and to open offices outside of Portland and Salem. A Survey USA poll taken a few days before the election showed that 23% of Republicans supported Wyden.

Huffman, widely considered as an underdog, financed his own campaign. He defended bonuses for Wall Street executives and questioned global warming.

Debates 
The first debate took place on October 21, 2010 in Medford, Oregon and was broadcast by KOBI-TV. Only the two major-party candidates, Huffman and Wyden, participated in the debate. The second debate, which was hosted by the City Club of Portland at the Governor Hotel, took place on October 22. The debate played live on KOIN and re-aired on Oregon Public Broadcasting later that night.

Predictions

Polling

Fundraising

Results

References

External links 
 Elections Division of the Oregon Secretary of State
 U.S. Congress candidates for Oregon at Project Vote Smart
 Oregon U.S. Senate 2010 from OurCampaigns.com
 Campaign contributions from Open Secrets
 2010 Oregon Senate General Election: Jim Huffman (R) vs Ron Wyden (D) graph of multiple polls from Pollster.com
 Election 2010: Oregon Senate from Rasmussen Reports
 2010 Oregon Senate Race from Real Clear Politics
 2010 Oregon Senate Race from CQ Politics
 Race profile from The New York Times
Official campaign websites
 Bruce Cronk for U.S. Senate
 Marc Delphine for U.S. Senate
 Jim Huffman for U.S. Senate
 Ron Wyden for U.S. Senate

Senate
Oregon
2010